The following lists events that happened in 1903 in El Salvador.

Incumbents
President: Tomás Regalado Romero (until 1 March), Pedro José Escalón (starting 1 March)
Vice President: Francisco Antonio Reyes (until 1 March), Calixto Velado (starting 1 March)

Events

January

 January – Voters in El Salvador voted for Pedro José Escalón to be President of El Salvador.

March

1 March – Conservative Pedro José Escalón was sworn in as President of El Salvador. Calixto Velado was sworn in as Vice President.

Undated

The Second Totoposte War was fought with Guatemala.

Deaths
 2 March – Rafael Zaldívar, politician (b. 1834)
 21 March – Carlos Ezeta, politician (b. 1852)

References

 
El Salvador
1900s in El Salvador
Years of the 20th century in El Salvador
El Salvador